Ibrahim II (died 1464) was a bey of Karaman.

Background

During the post-Seljuk era in the second half of the 13th century, numerous Turkoman principalities, which are collectively known as the Anatolian beyliks, emerged in Anatolia. Initially the Karamanids, centered on the modern provinces of Karaman and Konya, were the most important power in Anatolia. But towards the end of the 14th century the Ottomans began to dominate most of Anatolia, reducing Karamanid influence and prestige. Thus the campaign of Timur to Anatolia and the ensuing Ottoman Interregnum gave the Karamanids a chance for revival. However the Karamanids also experienced a period of interregnum during Ottoman interregnum, so they were unable to end Ottoman domination in Anatolia.

Ibrahim Bey and the Ottomans
Ibrahim Bey was Mehmet Bey's son. He fought against his uncle Ali Bey, and with Ottoman support he ascended to throne in 1424. Nevertheless, their help did not ensure his fidelity to the Ottomans. He secretly allied himself with Kingdom of Hungary against them. During the Ottoman wars in Europe, he was able to capture the city of Beyşehir from the Ottomans. However, in 1433, Ottoman Sultan Murat II returned to Anatolia and  Ibrahim sued for peace in 1435.<ref>Prof. Yaşar Yüce-Prof. Ali Sevim: Türkiye Tarihi Cilt I''', AKDTYKTTK Yayınları, İstanbul, 1991 p 252</ref> Nevertheless, shortly after the peace, Ibrahim laid a siege on Amasya an important Ottoman city to which Murat reacted by supporting the Dulkadirids to capture the city of Kayseri  and İsa, Ibrahim's brother, to capture Akşehir from Karamanids. Ibrahim was forced to lift the siege in 1437. During the following seven years peace prevailed in Anatolia. But in 1444 when a great crusader army began marching on the Ottoman capital, Ibrahim saw his chance and plundered Ottoman cities in Anatolia including Ankara and Kütahya. Murat, caught between two fires, had to sign the Treaty of Szeged with the crusaders and then returned to Anatolia and retaliated. Ibrahim was forced to sign a treaty with  unfavourable terms (called sevgendname). Although after Murat's death Ibrahim allied himself with Venice, he didn't fight against the Ottomans.

Ibrahim Bey and the other powers
Although Mamluks in Egypt supported İsa, Ibrahim's brother against Ibrahim during the early years, Ibrahim and the Mamluks were usually on good terms. However competition over Çukurova (ancient Cilicia) destroyed the friendship. Ibrahim captured the important castle of Corycus in Mediterranean coast (modern Kızkalesi) from the kingdom of Cyprus in 1448. This enabled him to conquer the rest of Çukurova. But Mamluks together with Turkmen beylik of Ramazan which was their vassal attacked on Karamanids in 1456. So Ibrahim gave up hopes to conquer Çukurova.

Last years
During his last years, his sons began struggling for the throne. His heir apparent was İshak, the governor of Silifke. But, Pir Ahmet, a younger son declared himself as the bey of Karaman in Konya. Ibrahim escaped to a small city in western territories where he died in 1464.

In popular media
In the 2012 film Fetih 1453'', Ibrahim of Karaman is played by Arslan İzmirli. He is depicted as a bey provoked by Emperor Constantine XI (Recep Aktuğ) to rebel against the Ottoman Empire. Later, he decides to make a peace agreement with Mehmed II (Devrim Evin).

References

Karamanids
1464 deaths
Year of birth unknown
15th-century monarchs in the Middle East
Ethnic Afshar people